The 12th Lumières Awards ceremony, presented by the Académie des Lumières, was held on 5 February 2007, at the Espace Pierre Cardin in Paris. The ceremony was chaired by Isabelle Mergault. Tell No One won the award for Best Film.

Winners and nominees
Winners are listed first and highlighted in bold.

See also
 32nd César Awards

References

External links
 
 
 12th Lumières Awards at AlloCiné

Lumières Awards
Lumières
Lumières
Lumières Awards
Lumières Awards